The following squads and players competed in the European Women's Handball Championship in 2006 in Hungary.

Austria 

 Nataliya Rusnatchenko
 Elisabeth Herbst 
 Petra Blazek 
 Sylvia Strass 
 Katharina Reingruber
 Birgit Engl 
 Stephanie Ofenböck 
 Sorina Teodorovic
 Marina Budecevic
 Simona Spiridon 
 Barbara Strass 
 Katrin Engel 
 Tatjana Logvin 
 Gabriela Eugenia Rotis-Nagy

Belarus 

 Natallia Petrakova
 Alena Abramovich
 Alesya Safonova
 Natallia Artsiomenka 
 Raisa Tsikhanovich 
 Hanna Sukhamirava 
 Iryna Artsiomenka 
 Hanna Stsiapanava 
 Volha Kandratsyeva
 Krystsina Svatko 
 Volha Kryuko
 Tatsiana Khlimankova 
 Alesia Kurchankova 
 Natallia Maylichka 
 Natalia Platanovich

Czech Republic 

 Kristyna Selicharova
 Vendula Ajglova
 Iva Zamorska
 Lucie Fabikova 
 Lenka Kysucanova
 Martina Knytlova 
 Simona Roubinkova
 Jana Fischerova
 Martina Saskova
 Lenka Flekova 
 Jana Arnosova
 Petra Valova 
 Martina Jonasova
 Jana Simerska
 Alena Polaskova
 Katerina Vaskova

Croatia 

 Ana Krizanac
 Ivana Jelcic
 Miranda Tatari 
 Ivanka Hrgovic 
 Maja Cop
 Dijana Golubic 
 Zdenka Kruselj 
 Andreja Saric 
 Anita Gace 
 Maida Arslanagic 
 Nikica Pusic
 Lidija Horvat
 Marija Popovic 
 Maja Zebic 
 Marija Borozan

Denmark 

Karin Mortensen
Rikke Schmidt
Louise Bager Nörgaard
Rikke Erhardsen Skov
Henriette Rönde Mikkelsen
 Anne Petersen 
 Laura Danielsen 
Rikke Hörlykke Jörgensen
Camilla Thomsen
 Lise Knudsen 
 Winnie Mølgaard
 Mette Sjøberg
Karen Brödsgaard
 Lene Tobiasen
Josephine Touray
Rikke Nielsen

France 

 Maylis Bordenave
 Stella Joseph-Mathieu
 Mariama Signaté 
 Leila Duchemann Lejeune
 Véronique Pecqueux-Rolland 
 Paule Baudouin
 Sophie Herbrecht 
 Stéphanie Cano 
 Isabelle Wendling 
 Nina Kamto Njitam
 Sabrina Legenty 
 Stéphanie Fiossonangaye 
 Christiane Vanparys-Torres
 Raphaelle Tervel 
 Marie Vautherot
 Bertile Betare

Germany 

Sabine Englert
 Alexandra Gräfer
Nadine Härdter
Grit Jurack
 Marion Erfmann
Nina Christin Wörz
Maren Baumbach
 Susanne Henze 
 Nikola Pietzsch
 Kathrin Blacha
 Milica Danilovic
 Heike Schmidt 
Stefanie Melbeck
Anja Althaus
 Daniela Harke
Clara Woltering

Hungary 

 Katalin Pálinger
 Irina Sirina
 Zsuzsanna Lovász
 Bojana Radulovics
 Ibolya Mehlmann
 Anita Kulcsár
 Beáta Bohus
 Bernadett Ferling
 Eszter Siti
 Anita Görbicz
 Gabriella Kindl
 Tímea Tóth
 Gabriella Szűcs
 Ivett Nagy
 Beatrix Balogh
 Krisztina Pigniczki

Norway 

Kjersti Beck
Katrine Lunde Haraldsen
Katja Nyberg
Ragnhild Margrethe Aamodt
Randi H. Gustad
Karoline Charlotte Dyhre Breivang
Kristine Lunde-Borgersen
Gro Hammerseng
Kari Mette Johansen
Elisabeth Hilmo
Camilla Nordberg Thorsen
Linn-Kristin Riegelhuth
Vigdis Haarsaker
Isabel Blanco
Göril Snorroeggen
Terese Pedersen

Romania 

 Paula Claudia Radulescu 
 Luminita Hutupan Dinu 
 Ramona Petruta Farcau 
 Anisoara Durac 
 Carmen Lungu
 Adina Olariu
 Mihaela Ani Secocico
 Aurelia Bradeanu 
 Madalina Simule
 Oana Andreea Manea
 Cristina Georgiana Varzaru 
 Valentina Neli Ardean Elisei 
 Simona Silvia Gogirla 
 Elena Avadanii 
 Roxana Gatzel
 Ionica Munteanu
 Ionela Gilca

Russia 

 Tatiana Alizar
Maria Sidorova
Natalia Shipilova
 Elena Sergeeva
Liudmila Postnova
Liudmila Bodnieva
Nadezda Muravyeva
Yana Uskova
Emiliya Turey
 Anna Kurepta 
 Evgenia Rvacheva 
 Alina Dolgikh
Ekaterina Marennikova
 Oksana Koroleva
 Natalia Parshina

Serbia 

 Jelena Savkovic
 Ana Vojcic
Jelena Popovic
Ana Djokic
Mirjana Milenkovic
 Andrijana Budimir 
 Maja Lojpur
Jelena Nisavic
 Ana Batinic 
 Ana Milovanovic
Tanja Milanovic
Svetlana Ognjenovic
 Marina Rokic 
Ivana Milosevic
Katarina Bulatovic
 Sladjana Djeric

Slovenia 

 Sergeja Stefanisin
 Barbara Gorski
 Olga Ceckova 
 Anja Argenti
 Mojca Dercar 
 Mihaela Ana Ciora
 Silvana Ilic 
 Vesna Vincic-Pus
 Nataliya Derepasko 
 Katja Kurent Tatarovac 
 Spela Cerar
 Tanja Dajcman 
 Tatjana Oder 
 Anja Freser 
 Nadiza Plesko

Spain 

Elisabet Lopez Valledor
Maria Eugenia Sanchez Bravo
Soraya Garcia Leite
Susana Pareja Ibarra
 Davinia Lopez Hernandez
 Beatriz Morales Tendero 
Marta Elisabet Mangue Gonzales
Macarena Aguilar Diaz
 Rocio Guerola Galera
Patricia Alonso Jimenez
Isabel Maria Ortuno Torrico
Veronica Maria Cuadrado Dehesa
Noelia Oncina Morena
 Aitziber Elejaga Vargas
Nelly Carla Alberto Fransisca
 Lidia Sanchez Alias

Sweden 

 Therese Brosson
 Madelene Grundström
 Helena Andersson 
 Kristina Linea Flognman 
 Matilda Linnea Boson 
 Anna Ljungdahl 
 Fanny Lagerström 
 Erika Nilsson
 Asa Koensberg 
 Katarina Arfwidsson Chrifi
 Jessica Enström 
 Sara Eriksson 
 Asa Elisabeth Eriksson 
 Johanna Aronsson
 Maria Lindqvist
 Sara Holmgren

Ukraine 

Nataliya Borysenko
Larysa Zaspa
 Olena Reznir 
 Anna Burmystrova 
Tetyana Shynkarenko
Ganna Syukalo
Iryna Shutska Sheyenko
Lyudmyla Shevchenko
 Vita Mukhina 
Nataliya Datsenko Lyapina
Anastasiya Pidpalova Borodina
 Anastasiya Sokol
 Kateryna Valyushek 
 Mariya Boklaschuk 
Olena Radchenko
 Maria Makarenko

References 

European Handball Championship squads